Moisés Mussa (January 1, 1900 – July 27, 1982) was a Chilean essayist, philosopher and educator of Arab descent.

References

External links
Moisés Mussa biography

1900 births
1982 deaths
Chilean people of Arab descent
Chilean educators
Chilean essayists
20th-century essayists
20th-century Chilean philosophers